Max King may refer to:

 Max King (theologian) (born 1930), founder of the school of thought known as Transmillennialism
 Max King (runner) (born 1980), American ultramarathon runner, winner of the 2014 IAU 100km World Championships
 Max King (rugby league) (born 1997), Australian professional rugby league footballer
 Max King (footballer) (born 2000), Australian rules footballer
 Max King (Emmerdale), fictional character on the British TV soap opera Emmerdale